The Order of Merit of the Italian Republic is the senior Italian order of merit. It was established in 1951 by the second President of the Italian Republic, Luigi Einaudi.

The highest-ranking honour of the Republic, it is awarded for "merit acquired by the nation" in the fields of literature, the arts, economy, public service, and social, philanthropic and humanitarian activities and for long and conspicuous service in civilian and military careers. The post-nominal letters for the order are OMRI.

The order effectively replaced national orders such as the Civil Order of Savoy (1831), the Order of the Crown of Italy (1868), the Order of Saints Maurice and Lazarus (1572) and the Supreme Order of the Most Holy Annunciation (1362).

Grades 
Investiture takes place twice a year – on 2 June, the anniversary of the foundation of the Republic, and on 27 December, the anniversary of the promulgation of the Italian Constitution. However, those awards on Presidential , related to termination of service or granted to foreigners, may be made at any time.

The six degrees with corresponding ribbons are as follows (with numbers to 2 June 2020):

The order is bestowed by decree of the President of the Italian Republic, as head of the orders of knighthood, on the recommendation of the President of the Council of Ministers. Except in exceptional circumstances, no one can be awarded for the first time a rank higher than Knight. The minimum age requirement is normally 35.

The Knight Grand Cross with Collar is awarded only to heads of state.

Recipients

Grand Cross with Collar 
 Presidency of Luigi Einaudi (12 May 1948 – 11 May 1955):

 Presidency of Giovanni Gronchi (11 May 1955 – 11 May 1962):

 Presidency of Antonio Segni (11 May 1962 – 6 December 1964):

 Presidency of Giuseppe Saragat (29 December 1964 – 29 December 1971):

 Presidency of Giovanni Leone (29 December 1971 – 15 June 1978):

 Presidency of Sandro Pertini (9 July 1978 – 29 June 1985):

 Presidency of Francesco Cossiga (3 July 1985 – 28 April 1992):

 Presidency of Oscar Luigi Scalfaro (25 May 1992 – 15 May 1999):

 Presidency of Carlo Azeglio Ciampi (18 May 1999 – 15 May 2006):

 Presidency of Giorgio Napolitano (15 May 2006 – 14 January 2015):

 Presidency of Sergio Mattarella (3 February 2015–incumbent):

Wearer's guide

Gallery

See also 
 Orders, decorations, and medals of Italy
 Order of Saints Maurice and Lazarus
 Supreme Order of the Most Holy Annunciation

Notes

References

External links 

 Ordine al Merito della Repubblica Italiana – Presidenza della Repubblica 
 Ordini dinastici della Real Casa di Savoia 

 
Civil awards and decorations of Italy
Italian Republic, Order of Merit of the
Merit of the Italian Republic, Order of
1951 establishments in Italy
Orders of merit